Kleitor or Cleitor (Greek: Κλείτωρ) is a former municipality in Arcadia, Peloponnese, Greece. Since the 2011 local government reform it is part of the municipality Gortynia, of which it is a municipal unit. The municipal unit has an area of 150.582 km2. Its population was 1,406 in 2011. The seat of the municipality was in Mygdalia.

History

Cleitor was a historic and powerful city-state in ancient Greece.

Subdivisions
The municipal unit Kleitor is subdivided into the following communities (constituent villages in brackets):
Agridi
Drakovouni
Kerpini (Kerpini, Ano Kalyvia, Kato Kalyvia)
Mygdalia (Mygdalia, Palaiopyrgos)
Pournaria (Pournaria, Mouria)
Prasino (Prasino, Kalyvia Karnesi)
Theoktisto
Valtesiniko (Valtesiniko, Kourouveli, Olomades)
Xirokarotaina

Population

External links
Kleitoras at the GTP Travel Pages

References

Populated places in Arcadia, Peloponnese